Bob Bryan and Mike Bryan were the defending champions but decided not to participate.
Johan Brunström and Raven Klaasen won the title, defeating Juan Sebastián Cabal and Robert Farah in the final, 6–3, 6–2.

Seeds

Draw

Draw

External links
 Main draw

Doubles